The 2016–17 ProB was the 10th season of the ProB, the third level of basketball in Germany. The champions and finalists of the league are promoted to the 2017–18 ProA. Weißenhorn Youngstars won the title after defeating PS Karlsruhe Lions in the finals.

Regular season

North

South

Relegation round

Playoffs
The champions and the runners-up of the playoffs would qualify for the 2017–18 ProA season.

See also
2016–17 Basketball Bundesliga
2016–17 ProA

References

External links
 Official website
 EuroBasket

3
ProB